Christodoulos Hatzipetros (10 May 1799 – 29 October 1869) was a Greek military leader during the Greek War of Independence, who became a general and adjutant to King Otto of Greece after Independence.

Life 
Hatzipetros was born in 1799, into a rich Aromanian family of Kodjabashis in the village of Veternikon (modern Neraidochori) in western Thessaly. He initially followed his family's trade, spending time as a merchant in Serres, Salonica and Vienna. In 1819 he became a member of the Filiki Etaireia. When the Greek War of Independence broke out in 1821 he immediately joined the rebels' ranks, and alongside Nikolaos Stournaras scored a number of early successes against the Ottoman forces in Thessaly. Hatzipetros served throughout the war, serving both in Central Greece and the Peloponnese under Kitsos Tzavellas and Georgios Karaiskakis, fighting with particular distinction in the battles of Neokastron and Arachova. Under Ioannis Kapodistrias, he was named a chiliarch, and under King Otto of Greece commander of the Royal Phalanx (a corps of veteran fighters of the War of Independence) of Eastern Greece.

Eventually, he rose to the rank of Major General and the post of aide-de-camp to Otto, but his inveterate womanizing led him to become involved in several sexual scandals (such as his notorious affair with Jane Digby) and caused him trouble with Queen Amalia, who demanded his dismissal from the court. In 1854, during the Crimean War, while Greece was officially neutral, he was charged with leading the invasion of Ottoman-ruled Thessaly at the head of irregular forces. Despite early successes, he was defeated and nearly captured by the Ottoman army near Kalambaka. He then continued to lead a guerrilla in the region until the occupation of Piraeus by the British and French forced the Greek government to recall its forces.

Hatzipetros remained aide-de-camp to Otto until the latter's ouster in 1862, and was then made honorary aide-de-camp to the new king, George I, until his death on 29 October 1869 (O.S.).

References 

1799 births
1869 deaths
19th-century Greek military personnel
Aromanian military personnel
Hellenic Army major generals
Greek military leaders of the Greek War of Independence
People from the Ottoman Empire of Greek descent
Greek people of Aromanian descent
Aromanians from the Ottoman Empire
Members of the Filiki Eteria
People from Trikala (regional unit)
Members of the Royal Phalanx